Gracciano is a village in Tuscany, central Italy, administratively a frazione of the comune of Montepulciano, province of Siena. At the time of the 2001 census its population was 507. Gracciano is about 58 km from Siena and 6 km from Montepulciano.

Dominican prioress and saint Agnes of Montepulciano was born in Gracciano in 1268.

References 

Frazioni of Montepulciano